Bernhard Attinger (born 22 July 1953) is a former Swiss curler.

He works as a vice-president of Curling Club Dübendorf and as a vice-president of Dübendorf-based company "Rossweid Immobilien AG".

Teams

Private life
Bernhard Attinger grew up in a family of curlers. His father Peter Attinger Sr. is a 1972 Swiss men's champion (he was skip of a team where Bernhard played and won his first national men's gold in 1972). His brothers - Peter Jr., Werner, Ruedi and Kurt - are curlers too, they won Swiss and European championships and Worlds medals when they played in Peter Jr.'s team. His nephew (Peter Jr.'s son) Felix is skip of team, he won Swiss men's silver in 2017 and bronze in 2016; Peter Jr. coached his team. Bernhard's daughter Sandra Ramstein-Attinger is a competitive curler too, she played on three Women's Worlds with teams skipped by Silvana Tirinzoni and Binia Feltscher-Beeli.

References

External links
 

Meister Historie | Curling Superliga 

Living people
1953 births
Swiss male curlers
European curling champions
Swiss curling champions